Zubair Mohamed Salih (1944 – 12 February 1998) was a Sudanese soldier and politician. Salih was the deputy of Omar al-Bashir in the military government from 1989 to 1993 and then he continued as al-Bashir's Vice President.

Salih died in the 1998 Sudan Air Force crash at Nasir. He was described as a crucial link between the Sudan People's Armed Forces and Dr. Hassan al-Turabi's National Islamic Front.

His name is also spelled Zubair Mohammad Salih, Zubeir Mohammed al-Saleh and Al-Zubair Mohamed Saleh.

References

1944 births
1998 deaths
Vice presidents of Sudan
Sudanese soldiers
Victims of aviation accidents or incidents in Sudan